This is a list of nationally significant 20th-century architecture in South Australia. The buildings listed here appear in the publication "Nationally significant 20th century buildings in South Australia".

See also
List of historic houses in South Australia

References

Architecture
Buildings and structures in South Australia
Houses in Adelaide
History of Adelaide
Historic houses
Architecture in South Australia
Lists of buildings and structures in South Australia